Universal's Cinematic Spectacular: 100 Years of Movie Memories was a lagoon show at  Universal Studios Florida. The attraction replaced Universal 360: A Cinesphere Spectacular in the park's center Lagoon. It featured famous scenes from Universal Pictures films projected onto large waterfall screens mixed with fountains and pyrotechnics. The show was narrated by actor Morgan Freeman, and was part of the 100th anniversary celebrations for Universal Studios throughout 2012. It opened  on May 8, 2012. The music for the "spectacular" was a combination of scores from different films, with some original pieces composed by Brian Tyler, who also adapted Jerry Goldsmith's Universal Pictures fanfare for the studio's current logo and composed the "Universal Pictures 100th Anniversary 
Theme" that was also based on Goldsmith's fanfare. The closure of the show was announced on October 10, 2017. Universal stated that the show was replaced with a new night show named Universal Orlando's Cinematic Celebration, which opened on July 16, 2018, and closed on March 9, 2023.

Soundtrack
 "Casper's Lullaby" and "One Last Wish" from Casper and "End Titles" from Apollo 13 by James Horner
 "Universal Pictures Fanfare" by Brian Tyler (arrangement) (originally composed by Jerry Goldsmith)
 "Main Theme" from The Last Starfighter by Craig Safan
 "Main Theme" from Back to the Future by Alan Silvestri
 "Max" from Cape Fear and "Prelude" from Psycho by Bernard Herrmann
 "Airport Chase," "Outtake Montage" and "Pulled Over" from Liar Liar by John Debney
 "The Wheat" and "The Battle" from Gladiator by Hans Zimmer
 "To the Stars" from Dragonheart by Randy Edelman
 "Escape/Chase/Saying Goodbye" from E.T. the Extra-Terrestrial by John Williams

Movie montage set of films

Intro Sequence
 Apollo 13
 The Invisible Man
 Van Helsing
 Frankenstein
 Dracula
 Dragonheart
 The Mummy (1999)
 The Mummy (1932)
 How the Grinch Stole Christmas
 King Kong
 Creature from the Black Lagoon
 Jaws
 Dante's Peak
 The Birds
 Jurassic Park
 E.T. the Extra-Terrestrial
 The Breakfast Club
 Seabiscuit
 To Kill a Mockingbird
 Born on the Fourth of July
 Field of Dreams
 Les Misérables
 Pride & Prejudice
 Rear Window
 Ray
 The Blues Brothers
 The Incredible Hulk
 The Bourne Ultimatum
 Conan the Barbarian
 High Plains Drifter
 Scarface
 Backdraft
 The Nutty Professor
 Animal House
 Casino
 Waterworld
 American Graffiti
 Wanted
 Fast Five
 The Fast and the Furious
 Back to the Future

Heroes Sequence
 Elizabeth: The Golden Age
 Backdraft
 Ray
 Back to the Future
 The Fast and the Furious
 Fast & Furious 6
 Apollo 13
 Spartacus
 Scent of a Woman
 Erin Brockovich
 Inglourious Basterds
 Born on the Fourth of July
 Back to the Future Part II
 Back to the Future Part III
 Scott Pilgrim vs. the World
 Peter Pan
 Hot Fuzz
 Battleship
 Waterworld
 The River Wild
 Contraband
 Saboteur
 Hellboy II: The Golden Army
 Out of Africa
 Winchester '73
 My Little Chickadee
 The Spoilers
 Wanted
 Blue Crush
 Fast & Furious
 Friday Night Lights
 The Express: The Ernie Davis Story
 Dune
 Cinderella Man
 Earthquake
 Inside Man
 Munich
 Milk
 Dragon: The Bruce Lee Story
 The Mummy Returns
 The Bourne Identity
 The Bourne Supremacy

Horror Sequence
 Van Helsing
 Psycho
 The Wolfman
 Red Dragon
 Dream House
 Dead Silence
 The Strangers
 Dracula
 The Mummy (1932)
 Frankenstein
 The Mummy (1999)
 The Invisible Man
 Bride of Chucky
 An American Werewolf in London
 Cape Fear
 Rear Window
 Creature from the Black Lagoon
 The Skeleton Key
 Hellboy II: The Golden Army
 The Thing
 Bordello of Blood
 The People Under the Stairs
 Halloween II
 Jaws
 Phantom of the Opera
 Bride of Frankenstein
 Jurassic Park
 Army of Darkness
 Tremors
 The Birds
 The Unborn
 Shaun of the Dead
 White Noise
 Dawn of the Dead
 Slither
 Drag Me to Hell

Laughter Sequence
 Bruce Almighty
 Meet the Fockers
 The Nutty Professor
 Babe
 The Big Lebowski
 American Pie
 Intolerable Cruelty
 Bridesmaids
 Fast Times at Ridgemont High
 Fletch
 Meet the Parents
 The Lorax
 Harvey
 Hop
 Harry and the Hendersons
 Despicable Me
 The 40-Year-Old Virgin
 Liar Liar
 Car Wash
 Knocked Up
 Kindergarten Cop
 Baby Mama
 Along Came Polly
 Uncle Buck
 Kicking and Screaming
 Role Models
 Happy Gilmore
 Welcome Home Roscoe Jenkins
 The Jerk
 Bridget Jones: The Edge of Reason
 The Break-Up
 Mamma Mia!
 Duck Soup
 Beethoven
 The Flintstones
 Buck Privates
 Smokey and the Bandit
 Ted
 Get Him to the Greek
 Mallrats
 Bring It On
 The Blues Brothers
 The Breakfast Club
 Parenthood
 Johnny English
 How the Grinch Stole Christmas
 Bean
 Nanny McPhee

Good vs. Evil Sequence
 Gladiator
 Munich
 Public Enemies
 Spartacus
 Jarhead
 Snow White and the Huntsman
 Robin Hood
 Les Misérables
 All Quiet on the Western Front
 The Mummy Returns
 The Incredible Hulk
 Hellboy II: The Golden Army
 King Kong
 Elizabeth: The Golden Age
 Inglourious Basterds
 Green Zone
 Fast & Furious 6
 Battleship

Triumph Sequence
 U-571
 Definitely, Maybe
 A Beautiful Mind
 The Pianist
 The Deer Hunter
 Les Misérables
 The Express: The Ernie Davis Story
 On Golden Pond
 Children of Men
 Schindler's List
 Seabiscuit
 Billy Elliot
 The Hurricane
 8 Mile
 Love Actually
 Coal Miner's Daughter
 Out of Africa
 Field of Dreams
 Sixteen Candles
 Elizabeth: The Golden Age

Kissing Sequence
 Shakespeare in Love
 The Egg and I
 Notting Hill
 Pillow Talk
 Bride of Frankenstein
 Charade
 Vertigo
 The Mummy (1999)
 Atonement

Outro Sequence
 Jurassic Park
 The Lost World: Jurassic Park
 King Kong
 The Mummy (1999)
 Dragonheart
 Gladiator
 Schindler's List
 Far and Away
 American Graffiti
 It's Complicated
 Lost in Translation
 Spy Game
 Gorillas in the Mist
 To Kill a Mockingbird
 Brokeback Mountain
 Frost/Nixon
 Patch Adams
 Bruce Almighty
 Scent of a Woman
 Babe
 Animal House
 E.T. the Extra-Terrestrial
 Apollo 13
 Despicable Me
 A Beautiful Mind
 The Motorcycle Diaries
 Les Misérables
 Mamma Mia!
 Fast Five
 American Wedding
 The Sting
 Jaws
 Back to the Future

See also
 2012 in amusement parks

References

External links
 
Press Release

Universal Studios Florida
Universal Parks & Resorts attractions by name
Amusement rides introduced in 2012
2012 establishments in Florida
2017 disestablishments in Florida